Hamnazar (Dari:  Alliance) is a major political party in Afghanistan's Meshrano Jirga.  It consists of mainly pro-Karzai MPs, who are Western sympathizers.  The group numbers some thirty parliamentarians, and is led by Amin Zai.

Sources
Logar Province, Center for Culture and Conflict Studies. (US) Naval Postrgraduate School.

References

Political parties in Afghanistan